Bill Braudis is a writer, voice actor and script writing instructor from Boston, Massachusetts who has also done stand-up comedy.

Career 
He started in stand-up in 1981, doing open mics at The Comedy Connection, in Boston and the Ding Ho, in Cambridge. A little over a decade later, Braudis made his first of 3 appearances on The Tonight Show, with Jay Leno, which were soon followed up by two appearances on "Late Night with Conan O'Brien."

Braudis has appeared in several Soup2Nuts programs, voicing Doug Savage in Science Court, as well as voicing "Bill," in Hey Monie!. Braudis also appeared in the first episode of Dr. Katz, Professional Therapist and played Dr. Meyers on O'Grady.  Braudis wrote for these shows, along with Home Movies. He also wrote for the short-lived sitcom on the WB network, Raising Dad, made by Jonathan Katz, the same comedian who created Dr. Katz. Braudis did a short stint on the Adult Swim's Metalocalypse thanks to his friend, Brendon Small and writer Tommy Blacha.

Besides Braudis's extensive TV writing, he has also written a feature film that was optioned and another that finished in the quarterfinals of the prestigious Nicholl Screenwriting Competition.

Personal life 
He lives with his wife, two children and dogs in the suburbs of Boston and currently teaches TV and film writing in the Film and TV Department at Boston University.

References

Writers from Boston
American comedy writers
American stand-up comedians
Living people
Comedians from Massachusetts
Year of birth missing (living people)